John Farnfold was a Member of Parliament (MP) for Bramber and Steyning in 1399. The subject was a resident of the 'rape of Bramber', a Sussex tax collector and lessee of certain woodlands of the FitzAlan family.

References

English MPs 1399
Tax collectors
Norman-language surnames
Surnames of Breton origin
Surnames of Norman origin
History of Sussex